Robert Eugene Brashers (March 13, 1958 – January 13, 1999) was an American serial killer and rapist who committed at least three murders from 1990 and 1998 in the states of South Carolina and Missouri. He committed suicide to avoid arrest for an unrelated crime, and was not identified as the killer until 2018, with the help of improved DNA technology.

Early life
Very little is known about Brashers' early life. Born on March 13, 1958, in Newport News, Virginia, he was the younger of two living children born to Doulis and Nancy Brashers. When he was young, the family moved to Huntsville, Alabama, where Brashers spent his childhood and youth. He reportedly had no problems with the law during his teenage years, did not use drugs or alcohol, and after graduation, he enlisted in the Army and served in the Navy for several years.

In the early 1980s, Brashers resigned from the Army and moved to Louisiana, settling in a house in New Orleans, but by the mid-1980s, he moved again to Fort Myers, Florida. He married in the early 1990s, had a daughter with his wife in 1992 and at some point had adopted two little girls.

Crimes

Attack on Michelle Wilkerson
In the fall of 1985, Brashers was arrested in Port St. Lucie on charges of assaulting a 24-year-old woman named Michelle Wilkerson. According to investigators, on November 22, Brashers met her in Fort Pierce and convinced her to accompany him to a bar. After spending their evening there, he took Wilkerson to a dark alleyway near a citrus grove, where, after drinking six Budweisers together, he attempted to make sexual advances on her.

Wilkerson refused and attempted to leave his vehicle, after which a fight ensued between the pair, during which Brashers shot her twice in the neck and head. Despite the severity of her injuries, Wilkerson remained conscious, managed to leave the car and hid in a culvert under the road. Having lost track of her, Brashers went to the beach and threw his gun into the sea. He then attempted to leave, but his truck got stuck in the sand, causing to start walking the streets in search of help. In the meantime, Wilkerson made her way to a nearby apartment building, where she received medical attention. Before she was driven to the Lawnwood Hospital, she described her assailant and his car in detail to police officers.

A few minutes later, Brashers was apprehended while wandering the beach and charged with attempted first-degree murder, aggravated battery and using a firearm during the commission of a crime. He was convicted in the following year and sentenced to 12 years imprisonment, but was granted parole on May 4, 1989.

Post-release crimes
After his release, Brashers moved between the states of South Carolina, Tennessee and Georgia, often changing his place of residence. On February 18, 1992, he was arrested in Cobb County, Georgia for grand theft auto, unlawful possession of a weapon and theft. While searching his vehicle and apartment, policemen found a radio scanner, a police jacket, lock-picking tools and a fake Tennessee driver's license. Fearing another prison sentence, he made a plea deal with the prosecutors and pleaded guilty to the most serious of the charges, allowing for the rest to be dropped. As a result, he was sentenced to an additional five years imprisonment, which he served in full and was released in February 1997. For the following two years, he moved between Tennessee, Arkansas and Missouri.

On April 12, 1998, Brashers was arrested while attempting to break into the home of an unmarried woman in Paragould, Arkansas. Having been employed by her on a previous occasion, he had cut the wires leading to her home and was armed at the time of his arrest. In addition, a video camera and locksmithing tools were seized from him as well. Brashers was taken into custody, but was later released after reaching a settlement with the victim, who stated that he had made amends with her.

Suicide
On January 13, 1999, police officers noticed that a stolen vehicle had been parked in the parking lot of the Super 8 Motel in Kennett, Missouri. After speaking with motel personnel, it was established that Brashers and his family had arrived in that vehicle just days earlier. Officers then broke down the door and found him hiding under a bed with a loaded gun, but when they attempted to arrest him, he started resisting and opened fire. The officers were forced to retreat and called for backup.

Within a few minutes, the motel grounds were surrounded with police cars, while Brashers took his wife, daughter and two stepdaughters hostage. After four hours of negotiations, he released the five hostages and attempted to shoot himself in the head. He remained alive for six more days, but succumbed to complications from his injuries on January 19. His death was later ruled a suicide.

Exposure
Brashers' name remained in obscurity until 2018, when genealogy experts from Parabon NanoLabs were able to find a familial match with a resident of Alabama in relation to the three murders and several rapes dating back to 1990. The suspects were narrowed down to several people, all of whom were relatives of Brashers. They agreed to undergo DNA testing, eliminating them all before leaving the deceased Brashers as the only viable suspect. In response, prosecutors from New Madrid County and Pemiscot County, Missouri filed a motion to exhume his remains and conducted additional testing. On September 27, 2018, the casket containing Brashers' remains was exhumed from the cemetery in Paragould, Arkansas, and DNA was extracted from the bones.

DNA testing revealed that his genotypic profile was a perfect match for the murderer of 28-year-old Genevieve "Jenny" Zitricki, who had been bludgeoned, raped and strangled with pantyhose at her apartment in Greenville, South Carolina on April 4, 1990. At the time, it had been established that after murdering her in the bedroom, the killer had dragged her body into a bathtub and submerged it, before writing "don't fuck with my family" on the bathroom's mirror. A DNA sample belonging to the perpetrator was isolated in 1995, and then uploaded to CODIS. Investigators were able to establish that at the time of Zitricki's murder, Brashers was living in Greenville not far away from her home.

DNA also linked him to the double murder of 38-year-old Sherri Scherer and her 12-year-old daughter Megan, both of whom were found shot to death at their home in Portageville, Missouri on March 12, 1998. Both victims had been tied up, Megan had been raped, before Brashers shot and killed both of them. Approximately two hours later, he broke into another home in Dyersburg, Tennessee, where he attempted to assault a 25-year-old woman. That victim fiercely resisted, however, causing her assailant to flee the crime scene. There was no useful biological evidence left behind, but forensic ballistics were able to prove that the same gun had been used in this attack as with the murders of the Scherers. The last crime he was linked to was the March 11, 1997, rape of a 14-year-old girl in Memphis, Tennessee.

Daughter's interview
In February 2019, Brashers' 27-year-old daughter Deborah was interviewed by reporters to recount some details of her father's biography. She said that she first saw her father in early 1997, after he had just been released from prison. According to her, for the next two years he lived with her, her mother and her half-sisters. During this time, she claimed that he was sometimes aggressive towards them; once fought her stepfather and caused him a head injury with a drill; and perhaps most disturbingly, he had made a tape recording of himself making small cuts on his neck and arm with a saw to see if he could withstand the pain. Deborah was inclined to believe that her mother Dorothy, who died in December 2018 at the age of 53, knew about her father's past activities, telling them to call him by a different name and to keep him inside the house.

In addition, she claimed that his mental health sharply deteriorated circa April 1998, and that his job at a construcion firm led him to be absent from the house for weeks at a time. During these periods, it is possible that he may have committed additional rapes and murders, but as of January 2023, no other crimes have been linked to him.

See also 
 Parabon NanoLabs
 List of serial killers in the United States

References

External links
 FindAGrave

1958 births
1999 deaths
1999 suicides
20th-century American criminals
American male criminals
American murderers of children
American rapists
American serial killers
Male serial killers
Suicides by firearm in Missouri
Violence against women in the United States
Violence against children
Criminals from Virginia
People from Newport News, Virginia